William Swarback  (1867–1949) was a 19th-century Major League Baseball player. He played for the New York Giants in 1887.

External links
Baseball Reference

Major League Baseball pitchers
19th-century baseball players
New York Giants (NL) players
1867 births
1949 deaths
Baseball players from New York (state)